Espíndola is a canton in the Province of Loja Ecuador.  It is located in the south-east, bordered by the cantons of Quilanga and Calvas, the province of Zamora-Chinchipe and the country of Peru.  It covers an area of 632 km2 at an altitude of 1720 m, with a population of 19,213.  The average temperature is 19.9 °C.

Demographics
Ethnic groups as of the Ecuadorian census of 2010:
Mestizo  97.0%
White  1.4%
Afro-Ecuadorian  1.1%
Montubio  0.4%
Indigenous  0.1%
Other  0.0%

Attractions
 The Black Lakes of Jumbura - a series of lakes at 3390m, occupying about 15 hectares.

References

Cantons of Loja Province